The fifth Langerado Festival was held from Friday, March 9, to Sunday, March 11, 2007. The event was expanded to three full days of music, which started with performances by Trey Anastasio and STS9 on Thursday, March 8.

Line-up
Friday March 9: Trey Anastasio, moe., Sound Tribe Sector 9, Bela Fleck and the Flecktones, North Mississippi All Stars, Galactic, Stephen Malkmus and the Jicks,  The Hold Steady, New Monsoon, Sharon Jones & The Dap-Kings, Tea Leaf Green, Assembly of Dust, Lotus

Saturday March 10: My Morning Jacket, Michael Franti and Spearhead, Medeski Martin and Wood, The Disco Biscuits, JJ Grey + Mofro, Soulive, Perpetual Groove, Yerba Buena, The Slip, Toubab Krewe, Apollo Sunshine, STS9

Sunday March 11: Widespread Panic, Matisyahu, O.A.R., The New Pornographers, Los Lobos, Taj Mahal, Toots & the Maytals, Cat Power and Dirty Delta, Pepper, Explosions in the Sky, New Orleans Social Club, The Mutaytor, Band of Horses, Girl Talk, The Spam Allstars, Rodrigo y Gabriela*, Kid Beyond.

Rodrigo y Gabriela were dropped from the set list at the last minute and were replaced by The Lee Boys.

Late night shows
Thursday March 8:
Sound Tribe Sector 9 and Trey Anastasio at Revolution
New Monsoon and Tea Leaf Green at Culture Room
Friday March 9:
The Disco Biscuits at Revolution
Mofro with special guest at Culture Room 

Saturday March 10:
Michael Franti & Spearhead at Revolution
North Mississippi Allstars with special guest at The Slip Culture Room

Sunday March 11
Perpetual Groove at Culture Room

External links
 Jambase: Welcome to Festival Season
 Ice Cream Man review
 The Second Supper review

Langerado
Langerado Music Festival
2007 in American music
2007 music festivals
Langerado